The British Virgin Islands national baseball team is the national baseball team of British Virgin Islands. The team represents British Virgin Islands in international competitions.

References

National baseball teams
Baseball
Baseball in the Caribbean